The 2022 NRL pre-season was played between 12 February and 28 February 2022, before a 10-day lead up until the beginning of the 2022 NRL season.

Background
The 2022 NRL pre-season will feature nineteen matches across three weekends, including the 2022 All Stars match and the annual Charity Shield match between the South Sydney Rabbitohs and St George Illawarra Dragons. The 2022 season also saw the cancellation of the World Club Challenge between reigning NRL premiers Penrith Panthers and 2021 Super League winners St Helens due to complications with the COVID-19 pandemic.

The pre-season also saw the first ever rugby league match to be played in the western Victorian city of Ballarat when Melbourne Storm played the Newcastle Knights at Mars Stadium in front of 5,127 people. The Charity Shield match also drew the highest attendance for the fixture since 2017, and aside from the All Stars match, was the largest attended match of the pre-season with 9,257 fans.

The match between the New Zealand Warriors and the Gold Coast Titans was cancelled after being initially postponed and rescheduled from Moreton Daily Stadium to Cbus Super Stadium due to the 2022 South East Queensland flood.

Fixtures

First week

Second week

Third week

a The match was initially scheduled to be played on 26 February at Moreton Daily Stadium, but was rescheduled due to the 2022 South East Queensland flood.

See also
 2022 NRL season
 2022 NRL season results

References

2022 NRL season